The Lebanese Basketball League is the top-tier professional men's basketball league in Lebanon. It is organized annually as a national championship with playoffs and a national cup by the Lebanese Basketball Federation (FLB).

Currently, the league consists of 12 teams, of which six are located in Beirut. The most successful club in the history of the league is Al Riyadi who have won a record 16 championships.

History 
The initial Lebanese basketball league was formed in as early as the 1950s; however, it was stopped during the Lebanese Civil War. In 1992, the league was reformed into a fully professional format.

In 1997, Sporting Club (Al Riyadi) finished as Lebanese champions, allowing them to participate in the 1998 FIBA Asia Champions Cup . There, they finished 3rd place. That same year, Al Riyadi lost the Lebanese championship to their big rivals Sagesse Club (Hekmeh).

In 1998, Beirut hosted the Arab Club Championship. Hekmeh won, the first ever basketball trophy for Lebanon. 

In 1999, Beirut hosted the Arab Club Championship again. Hekmeh repeated as champions.

Al Riyadi has its greatest success in the Arab Club Championship during the 2000s. They won the title in 2005, 2006, 2007, 2009, and 2010. In 2009, they defeated their fellow Lebanese team Hekmeh in the final, the first time two Lebanese teams met in the final. The 2009 tournament was held in Beirut.

Overview

The league is the first division in Lebanese basketball. The team that finishes last each season is relegated to the Second Division, while the Second Division's top four teams compete in a play-off system. The team that wins is promoted for the next season.

Competition
There are 12 teams in the league. They play a round-robin format; each team plays all other teams once home and once away. At the end of the regular season, the top eight teams enter the playoffs and play a best of 5 series in the quarterfinals. The winners of the quarterfinals advance to the best of seven series in the semifinals. The two teams that advance play a best of seven series in the final, and the winner is the league champion.

Teams

The following 12 teams play in the 2022–23 season.

Champions

Wins by year
FLB League (standings since 1993)

Wins by team

Rivalries 
The Big Rivalry
 Al Riyadi vs Sagesse Club.

Other Rivalries
 Al Riyadi vs Champville
 Homenetmen Beirut vs  Al Riyadi
 Champville vs Sagesse Club
 Tadamon Zouk vs Sagesse Club

Notable players

 Bassel Bawji
 Rony Fahed
 Rodrigue Akl
 Roy Samaha
 Ali Haidar
 Elie Stephan
 Elie Rustom
 Elie Mechantaf
 Ali Mezher
 Wael Arakji
 Mohammad Ibrahim
 Ahmad Ibrahim
 Amir Saoud
 Fadi El Khatib
 Joe Vogel
 Rony Fahed
 Ali Mahmoud
 Brian Beshara
 Jean Abdelnour
 Sabah Khoury
 Omar El Turk
 Ghaleb Rida
 Ali Kanaan
 Billy Pharis
 Daniel Faris
 Matt Freije
/ Ekene Ibekwe
 Ace Custis
 DeWayne Jackson
 Patrick Rembert
 Dion Dixon
 Corey Williams
 Samaki Walker
 Brian Cook
 Tony Madison
 Alvin Sims
 C.J. Giles
 Darryl Watkins
 Lee Nailon
 Herbert Hill
 Jumaine Jones
 Loren Woods
 Priest Lauderdale
 Dewarick Spencer
 Flip Murray
 Desmond Penigar
 Rasheim Wright
 Marcus Haislip
 Harold Jamison
 Andre Emmett
 Nate Johnson
 Marc Salyers
 Earl Barron
 Scotty Thurman
 Rick Hughes
 DeShawn Sims
 Aaron Harper
 LeRoy Hurd
 Tre Kelley
 Sam Hoskin
 Quincy Douby
 Ronnie Fields
 Willie Burton
 Marlon Parmer
 Booker Woodfox
 Reyshawn Terry
 DerMarr Johnson
 Rashad Anderson
 Jerald Honeycutt
 Hassan Whiteside
 Terrell Stoglin
 Dickey Simpkins
 Cedric Henderson
 Jeremiah Massey
 Ruben Patterson
 Rashad McCants
 Sherell Ford
 Jamal Robinson
 Aleksandar Radojević
 Alpha Bangura
 Ismail Ahmed
 Salah Mejri
 Ali Traore
 Ndudi Ebi
 Nikoloz Tskitishvili
 Jeleel Akindele
 Dalibor Bagarić
 Asghar Kardoust
 Hamed  Haddadi
 Ratko Varda
 Vladan Vukosavljević
 Sani Sakakini
 Michael Madanly
 Marcus Banks
 Walter Hodge
 Makrem Ben Romdhane
 Sam Young (basketball)
  Rony Seikaly
  Justin Brownlee

Notable coaches

 Ghassan Sarkis
 Joe Moujaes
 Joe Ghattas
 George Geagea
 Slobodan Subotić
 Ilias Zouros
 Nenad Vucinic
 Veselin Matic
 Dragan Raca
 Tab Baldwin

Women's league
2019–20 teams:
Antranik SC
Al Riyadi Club Beirut 
Homenetmen Antelias 
Hoops Club
Chabibeh
Energy Sports Club

References

External links
 Lebanese Basketball Federation (FLB) website
 Lebanese Basketball League Facebook
 Lebanese Basketball League Twitter
 Lebanese Basketball League Twitter

 
Lea
Basketball leagues in Asia
Women's basketball leagues in Asia
Sports leagues established in 1992
1992 establishments in Lebanon
Basketball